Paraxenodillo is a genus of armadillo woodlice, terrestrial crustacean isopods of the family Armadillidae. The only species within the genus is Paraxenodillo singularis, that lives in the island of Annobón in Equatorial Guinea. The species and the genus were described in 1983 by Helmut Schmalfuss and Franco Ferrara.

References

Further reading
 Schmalfuss, H. 2003. World catalog of terrestrial isopods (Isopoda: Oniscidea). Stuttgarter Beiträge zur Naturkunde, Serie A Nr. 654: 341 pp.

Woodlice
Endemic fauna of Annobón
Invertebrates of Equatorial Guinea
Taxa named by Franco Ferrara (botanist)
Monotypic arthropod genera